Ei Chaw Po (born 3 January 1991) is a Burmese actress, model and singer. She is considered one of the most successful actresses in Myanmar and one of the highest paid actresses. She has been three-time nominated for the Best Actress at the Myanmar Academy Award for 2016, 2017, and 2018. Throughout her career, she has acted in over 250 films.

Early life and education
Ei Chaw Po was born on 3 January 1990 in Yangon, Myanmar to parent Cho Maung and Thida San. She is the second child among three siblings, having an older brother, Ye Min Oo and a younger sister, Ei Thiri Cho Maung. She attended high school at Basic Education High School No. 2 Kamayut. She was picked the "Queen" (beauty queen) as a freshman at the university. She graduated with a BA cinematography and drama in 2010, and Music diploma in 2012 from National University of Arts and Culture, Yangon.

Acting career

2006–2008: Beginning as a model and beauty queen

Ei Chaw Po began her modeling career in 2006. She appeared on many local magazine cover photos. In 2008, she competed in local pageant contests and won many contests and hold continental titles are

Miss TRI 2008 (Winner)
Miss Sick & Shine 2008 (Winner)
Miss Smooth E 2008 (Winner)
Miss Seven Days 2008 (Winner)

2010–2013: Film debut and recognition
In 2010, she was selected an actress in the new face actor choice contest TV program "Anu Phin Nyar Pyo Khin". She made her acting debut with a main role in the film Hla Pa Thaw Wut (Pretty Karma) in 2010. She then starred in film York Kyar Ko Yaung Sar Mal (I Gonna Sell My Husband!), where she played the leading role for a first time with Pyay Ti Oo. The film was both a domestic hit, and led to increased recognition for Ei Chaw Po.

2014–present: Breaking into the big screen and success
In 2014, she took on her first big-screen leading role in the romance film Shwe Dingar Ko Htwe Khinn Ka Sar Mal, alongside Nay Toe, directed by Nyi Nyi Tun Lwin which screened in Myanmar cinemas in 2015. She was three-time nominated as the Best Actress at the Myanmar Academy Award for 2016, 2017, and 2018. From 2010 to present, she has acted in over 50 big screen films and over 200 films.

In 2017, she starred the female lead in the big-screen film Kyway alongside Hlwan Paing and Tyron Bejay which premiered in Myanmar cinemas on 20 July 2018.

In 2018, she starred in the big-screen film Houk Ser where she played the lead role with Myint Myat and Kyaw Kyaw Bo. The film was premiered in Myanmar cinemas on 11 January 2019 and received critical acclaim and positive reviews for her portrayal of the character.

Music career
Ei Chaw Po is also active as a solo singer. She started singing in 2013, and participated in group albums "Shwe Thachin Myar Nae Pyan Than Chin" (Flying with the golden songs) in 2015 and "VeVe 20th Anniversary" in 2016. A song from VeVe group album "A Lo Chin Sone Sanda" (The Most Desire) was a hit song in the country.

Afterwards, she released her first single song "Gypsy Boy" in 2018. The single sang together with her younger sister Ei Thiri Cho Maung and became widely popular since the day she released it on her official Facebook page and YouTube channel. Since 2016, Ei Chaw Po started entertaining as a singer in Thingyan music concerts every year. She endeavoring to be able to produce and distribute a solo album and will drop on soon.

Advertising/ Brand Ambassadorships
Ei Chaw Po appeared in a video advertisement for the Myanmar Awzar Fertilizer with actor Nay Toe in 2014. She was appointed as brand ambassador of Ve Ve in 2016. She has appeared in commercial model for many advertisements in Myanmar.

Filmography

Film (Cinema)

Over 50 films, including 
Shwe Dingar Ko Htwe Khinn Ka Sar Mal (ရွှေဒင်္ဂါးကိုထွေခင်းကစားမယ်) (2014)
3Girls (သရဲမ၊ဘီလူးမနှင့်မိန်းမပျို) (2017)
Kyway (ကြွေ) (2018)
Tasay Par Lar Pyi (တစ္ဆေပါလာပြီ) (2018)
Chu Si (ချူဆီ) (2017)
Houk Ser (ဟောက်စား) (2019)
LadyBoy (2019)
A Chit Sone Crush?(2019)
Players (ပလေယာ) (2020)

Film

Over 200 films, including 
Hla Pa Thaw Wut (လှပသောဝဋ်) (2010)
York Kyar Ko Yaung Sar Mal (ယောက်ျားကိုရောင်းစားမယ်) (2010)

Discography

Singles
 Gypsy Boy (2018)

Songs from collaborative albums

 Dar Thwar Htet Ka Pyar Yay Sat (Shwe Thachin Myar Nae Pyan Than Chin) (2015)
 A Lo Chin Sone Sanda (VeVe 20th Anniversary) (2016)

References

External links

1990 births
Living people
Burmese film actresses
Burmese female models
21st-century Burmese actresses
People from Yangon